Göschenen railway station is a railway station in the Swiss canton of Uri and municipality of Göschenen. Situated on the original line of the Gotthard railway, at the northern mouth of the Gotthard Tunnel, the station is also the junction point with the Schöllenenbahn. Most trains on the Gotthard route now use the Gotthard Base Tunnel and do not pass through Göschenen station.

The Gotthard railway connects Göschenen via Immensee with Zürich in the north, and via the Gotthard Rail Tunnel and Chiasso with Milan in the south. The importance of the line decreased in the 2010s with the opening of the Gotthard Base Tunnel (2016) and Ceneri Base Tunnel (2020), creating a new fast route between Central Switzerland and Ticino. Südostbahn now runs hourly panoramic service over the route.

The Schöllenenbahn, a very short metre gauge branch line, operates between Göschenen and Andermatt, just  to the south.  It is operated by the Matterhorn Gotthard Bahn (MGB), and connects the Gotthard railway with southern Switzerland's metre gauge railway network.

Services 
 the following services stop at Göschenen:

 Gotthard Panorama Express: daily tourist oriented service between Lugano and Arth-Goldau, with connecting boat service on Lake Lucerne to Lucerne.

References

External links
 
 
 Matterhorn Gotthard Bahn

Matterhorn Gotthard Bahn stations
Railway stations in the canton of Uri
Swiss Federal Railways stations
Railway stations in Switzerland opened in 1882